Istiqlal Party (Independence Party) may refer to:

 Istiqlal Party in Morocco.
 Independence Party (Mandatory Palestine)
 Iraqi Independence Party
 Independence Party (Egypt)